Greely Stevenson Curtis (November 21, 1830 – February 12, 1897) was a volunteer officer in the Union Army during the American Civil War.

Early life and education
Greely Stevenson Curtis was born November 21, 1830, at Boston, Massachusetts. His brother was James F. Curtis who was Colonel of the 4th California Volunteer Infantry Regiment and also was awarded the honorary grade of brevet brigadier general for faithful and meritorious services during the war.

Civil War service
Curtis was a captain in the 2nd Massachusetts Volunteer Infantry Regiment. He became lieutenant colonel and commander of the 1st Massachusetts Volunteer Cavalry.

On March 28, 1867, President Andrew Johnson nominated Curtis for the award of the honorary grade of brevet brigadier general, United States Volunteers, to rank from March 13, 1865, for gallant and meritorious services during the war, and the U.S. Senate confirmed the award on March 30, 1867.

Post-war life
After the war, Curtis was a civil engineer, architect and fire commissioner of Boston between 1876 and 1878. Greely S. Curtis died February 12, 1897, at Boston, Massachusetts. He is buried at Mount Auburn Cemetery, Cambridge, Massachusetts.

See also

List of Massachusetts generals in the American Civil War
Massachusetts in the American Civil War

Notes

References

Hunt, Roger D. and Brown, Jack R. Brevet Brigadier Generals in Blue.  Gaithersburg, MD: Olde Soldier Books, Inc., 1990. .

External links
Papers, 1797-1991. Schlesinger Library, Radcliffe Institute, Harvard University.
Greely Stevenson Curtis Papers at Stuart A. Rose Manuscript, Archives, and Rare Book Library

Union Army generals
People of Massachusetts in the American Civil War
1830 births
1897 deaths
Burials at Mount Auburn Cemetery
Commissioners of the Boston Fire Department
People from Boston